Bulli may refer to:

 Bulli, New South Wales, Australia, a suburb of Wollongong
 Bulli FC, a semi-professional football club
 Bulli railway station
 Electoral district of Bulli
 Bulli (plant), a species of tree in the family Asteraceae
 Manoba bulli, a moth of family Nolidae
 Pollex bulli, a moth of family Erebidae
 Volkswagen Type 2 or Volkswagen Microbus Concept, vehicles sometimes called a Bulli
Bulli Bai, cyber-stalking website in India

See also
 Buli (disambiguation)
 Bullis (disambiguation)
 Bully (disambiguation)